Kept Man is a 2014 short film suspense drama directed by Brett Annese and written by Wilson Cleveland, who it also stars. The film, set in Los Angeles, is a two-hander that depicts the intense relationship between Cleveland's character Jake and his new boyfriend, Brian played by Hartley Sawyer, who is slowly losing his grip on reality.

The film was released for Halloween on October 31, 2014 on YouTube. A second cut of the film, featuring three additional scenes was released for Valentine's Day on February 14, 2015, on Amazon Prime Video and Vimeo On Demand.

Cast 
 Wilson Cleveland as Jake
 Hartley Sawyer as Brian

Reception 
The film received generally favorable reviews from critics. In his December 9, 2014 IndieWire review, Joseph Ehrman-Dupre called Kept Man "a moody, mysterious, and shocking film" with "a twist you know is coming, but you won't guess it" and NewMediaRockstars' Evan DeSimone credited the film as being "perfectly constructed to keep the viewer off balance."

On May 19, 2015 the International Academy of Digital Arts and Sciences honored the film with a 2015 Webby Award for Individual Short (Drama).

References

External links 

 Kept Man - Official Website
 

2014 films
American LGBT-related films
Films set in Los Angeles
2010s English-language films
2010s American films